Montebello di Bertona (locally Mundibbèlle) is a comune and town in the province of Pescara, in the Abruzzo region of Italy. It is located in the natural park known as the "Gran Sasso e Monti della Laga National Park".

References

Cities and towns in Abruzzo